La vergine, il toro e il capricorno (internationally released as The Virgo, the Taurus and the Capricorn, Erotic Exploits of a Sexy Seducer, Not Tonight Darling (not to be confused with the 1971 British drama Not Tonight, Darling), Bull by the Horns and The Virgin, the Bull and the Capricorn) is a 1977 Italian sexy comedy film directed by  Luciano Martino. According to the film critic Paolo Mereghetti, the film is "one of the most funny films" in the commedia sexy all'italiana genre.

Plot
An established Milanese architect who lives in Rome (Alberto Lionello), indomitable unfaithful to his wife (Edwige Fenech), does everything not to be discovered by her. But when this happens, the wife takes revenge by cheating on her husband with a young architecture student (Ray Lovelock).

Cast 
Alberto Lionello: Gianni Ferretti
Edwige Fenech: Gioia Ferretti
Aldo Maccione: Felice Spezzaferri
Alvaro Vitali: Alvaro 
Mario Carotenuto: Comm. Benito Gussoni 
Ray Lovelock: Patrizio Marchi
Erna Schürer: Tourist with Patrizio
Olga Bisera: Enrica
Riccardo Garrone: Husband of Enrica
Michele Gammino: Raffaele 
Patrizia Webley: Wife of Raffaele
Giacomo Rizzo: Peppino Ruotolo
Ugo Bologna: Father of Gianni 
Gianfranco Barra: Alberto Scapicolli
Lars Bloch: American professor
Lia Tanzi: Luisa

References

External links

1977 films
1970s sex comedy films
Adultery in films
Commedia sexy all'italiana
Films set in Rome
1970s Italian-language films
1977 comedy films
Films scored by Franco Pisano
1970s Italian films